Jorge Héctor Wilson (25 January 1915 – 8 March 1998) was a field hockey player, who competed for Argentina at the 1948 Summer Olympics, he played in two group games.

References

External links
 

Olympic field hockey players of Argentina
Argentine male field hockey players
1915 births
Field hockey players at the 1948 Summer Olympics
1998 deaths